In Greek mythology, the Gargareans, or Gargarenses, ( Gargareis) were an all-male tribe.  They copulated with the Amazons annually in order to keep both tribes reproductive.  Varying accounts suggest that they may have been kidnapped, raped, and murdered for this purpose, or that they may have had relations willingly.  The Amazons kept the female children, raising them as warriors, and gave the males to the Gargareans.

The Gargareans are held by some historians to be a component of the ancestry of the Nakh peoples, and equivalent or at least related to the Georgian name Dzurdzuks.

According to Strabo, "[...] the Amazons live close to Gargarei, on the northern foothills of the Caucasus mountains". Gaius Plinius Secundus localizes Gargarei at North of the Caucasus, but calls them Gegar. Jaimoukha suggests that the myth might have been a nod to the similarity between Circassians and Durdzuks, despite their very different languages. The Ancient Greek chronicler Strabo mentioned that both the Gargareans and Amazons had migrated from Themiscyra and notes that Gargareans is one of many Nakh roots- gergara, meaning, in fact, "kindred" in proto-Nakh.

In popular media

 In DC Comics, the Gargareans are an all-male tribe of undead Greek warriors, revived by Zeus to serve as male counterparts to the Amazons of Themyscira, living on the Island of Thalarion forbidden to women. Their king is the specially created wonder warrior Achilles Warkiller.
 In Hercules and the Amazon Women, Hercules and Iolaus are brought to the Gargarean village, in which they are asked for help about monsters terrorising them, only for it to turn out that the monsters are the Amazons.
 In The Venture Bros, Season 6 Episode 1, Warriana, an Amazon, says "See you around, Gargarean." to Brock Samson after he expresses his desire for her under the influence of her Truth Lasso. In later episodes the two characters begin a sexual relationship.

References

Legendary tribes in Greco-Roman historiography
Nakh peoples
Single-gender worlds
Characters in Greek mythology